The 1944 Detroit Tigers season was a season in American baseball. The team finished second in the American League with a record of 88–66, just one game behind the first place St. Louis Browns.

Offseason 
 October 11, 1943: Rip Radcliff was traded by the Tigers to the Philadelphia Athletics for Don Heffner and Bob Swift.
 Prior to 1944 season: Joe Ginsberg was signed as an amateur free agent by the Tigers.

Regular season 
On April 19, first baseman Rudy York recorded his 1,000th career hit.

On September 18, the Tigers found themselves in first place for the first time all season. The Yankees lost two games to the Athletics, while the Browns split two games with the White Sox. With the Tigers sweeping Cleveland, the Tigers jumped over the Yankees and Browns for first place. The Browns were a half game back, while the Yankees were two games back.

Season standings

Record vs. opponents

Roster

Player stats

Batting

Starters by position 
Note: Pos = Position; G = Games played; AB = At bats; H = Hits; Avg. = Batting average; HR = Home runs; RBI = Runs batted in

Other batters 
Note: G = Games played; AB = At bats; H = Hits; Avg. = Batting average; HR = Home runs; RBI = Runs batted in

Pitching

Starting pitchers 
Note: G = Games pitched; IP = Innings pitched; W = Wins; L = Losses; ERA = Earned run average; SO = Strikeouts

Other pitchers 
Note: G = Games pitched; IP = Innings pitched; W = Wins; L = Losses; ERA = Earned run average; SO = Strikeouts

Relief pitchers 
Note: G = Games pitched; W = Wins; L = Losses; SV = Saves; ERA = Earned run average; SO = Strikeouts

Awards and honors 
1944 MLB All-Star Game
 Pinky Higgins
 Hal Newhouser 
 Dizzy Trout 
 Rudy York

Farm system 

LEAGUE CHAMPIONS: Jamestown

Notes

References 

1944 Detroit Tigers season at Baseball Reference

Detroit Tigers seasons
Detroit Tigers season
Detroit Tigers
1944 in Detroit